Erkech may refer to -
Erkeç, a small village in Azerbaijan
The former name of Kozichino near Pomorie in Bulgaria
The distinctive Erkech dialect that originated in the Erkech/Kozichino area of Bulgaria